Jan Farský (born 11 July 1979) is a Czech politician who was a member of the Chamber of Deputies (MP) from May 2010 to February 2022, and has been vice-chair of the Mayors and Independents (STAN) since April 2019. He was previously a representative in the Liberec Regional Assembly from 2008 to 2010 and again from 2016 to 2018, and the Mayor of Semily from 2006 to 2014.

Early life and education
Farský was born in Turnov in 1979. He received secondary education at the Ivan Olbracht Gymnazium in Semily, and graduated from the Faculty of Law at Masaryk University in Brno with a master's degree in 2002.

Farský began his professional career as a municipal lawyer in Semily. After a year he transferred to a private law office to work as a trainee solicitor, before becoming an adviser to Deputy Prime Minister for Economic Policy Martin Jahn. He subsequently started working for Škoda Auto, as an adviser in the department for relations with public institutions.

Political career

Municipal politics 
Farský entered politics in 2002, when he was elected onto the municipal council in Semily. Four years later he became the Mayor of Semily, as the leader of a local political movement, Volba pro Semily ("Choice for Semily"). He remained in this office for 8 years. Before municipal elections in 2014, he announced that he would not seek reelection as mayor anymore, and in March 2015 he again became a municipal councillor in the town.

In the 2018 municipal elections he ran as a member of STAN, but on the Volba pro Semily candidate list for the municipal council. He received the 7th largest number of preference votes of the 168 candidates running, but was not elected, and ended up as a first alternate. At the beginning of April 2019, following the death of his party colleague Klára Valentová, Farský succeeded her as a municipal representative.

Regional politics 
In 2008, Farsky co-founded the Mayors for the Liberec Region (SLK) party, for which he was also the chair from 2008 to 2009, and vice-chair from November 2009. He stood down as vice-chair and left the party in 2017.

From 2008, Farsky was a member of the Liberec Regional Assembly. He resigned from this post upon his election to the Chamber of Deputies in 2010, and did not stand in the next regional elections in 2012. In regional elections in 2016, he was again elected to the Liberec Regional Assembly on the SLK candidate list. He resigned in January 2018, citing his workload.

Chamber of Deputies 
Farský was elected to the Chamber of Deputies in elections in 2010, on the candidate list of TOP 09. Despite being placed last place on the ballot, Farský received 3,425 preferential votes to be elected as an MP. He was reelected in 2013, running as the lead candidate on the combined list of TOP 09 and STAN in the Liberec Region. He received nearly 16% of preference votes cast for his list. From December 2013 he was deputy vice-chair of the Constitutional Law Committee. He was one of seven Czech members elected to the Permanent Delegation to the Parliamentary Assembly of NATO in 2010. He was also a member of the Committee for European Affairs from 2017 to 2021.

Farský's main areas of policy interest are transparency in the public sector and public spending, anti-corruption legislation, public contracts, reducing the regional gap, and procurement rules. In June 2012 Jan Farský introduced a draft law on the contracts registry, intending to make data on public expenditure easily accessible online to the public, apart from in exceptional cases, similar to the policy introduced in Slovakia in 2011. The bill was passed into law on 24 November 2015. He was also involved in gambling taxation and the strengthening of municipal powers to restrict slot machine gambling. He has also repeatedly proposed legislation to move certain state agencies from Prague to other regions.

In 2020, the Chamber of Deputies passed a proposal by Farsky to grant five extra days of paid vacation to camp leaders and coaches of youth sports teams.

In the 2017 legislative elections, Farsky was the national leader of STAN and their lead candidate in Prague, as STAN entered the Chamber of Deputies for the first time running on its own. Farský won 5,269 preferential votes and retained his seat. On 23 October 2017, he was elected chair of the STAN parliamentary group.

On 13 April 2019, at the 10th Republican Congress, Farsky was elected 1st vice-chairman of STAN, running unopposed and receiving 93% of the votes. At the end of August 2021, he was reelected to this position, again running unopposed and receiving 94% of the votes of delegates present.

In parliamentary elections in 2021, Farsky was a member of STAN and leader of the Pirates and Mayors coalition list in Liberec Region, winning reelection to the Chamber of Deputies. He subsequently also became chair of the STAN parliamentary group.

Fulbright scholarship controversy 
In January 2022, Farsky accepted an eight-month Fulbright scholarship in the United States, and announced his intention to remain as a member of the Chamber of Deputies during that time. Critics, including former Czech prime ministers Vladimír Špidla, Mirek Topolánek and Petr Necas as well as opposition parties, raised concerns that he would not be focused on his work as a Deputy while completing the scholarship.

Farsky argued that stepping down as a member of the Chamber of Deputies would mean deceiving those who had voted for him and for STAN. Milos Zeman accused Farsky of committing fraud against his voters and making his party untrustworthy. STAN leader Vít Rakušan commented that the party had perceived the social mood about the issue. Farsky also said that Czech prime minister Petr Fiala supported his decision to take leave for the scholarship. This was denied by Fiala, who said he had voiced his concerns, and would not have accepted the scholarship had he been in Farsky's position.

Farsky resigned his seat on 20 January 2022.

Other activities 
In February 2013, Farský became a board member of Aspen Institute Prague, an international non-profit organization which opened in the Czech Republic in July 2012. He also joined the board of directors of the Karel Schwarzenberg Forum shortly after it was formed in September 2013.

In 2014, Farský founded the Mayors to Mayors platform, to allow municipal politicians to share knowledge and experience on topics including architecture, cultural heritage, transparency, and innovation in municipal management.

Awards and recognition 
In the Křišťálová Lupa (Crystal Magnifying Glass) Awards in 2011, Farský's amendment to the lottery law on internet censorship won first place in the "anti-award" category. An identical version of this law was later approved in 2018.

In October 2014 Farsky was one of 14 Czechs included in a list of the 100 best innovators in Central and Eastern Europe, published by The Financial Times, the International Visegrad Fund, Google, and the Polish Res Publica magazine.

He is also a laureate of the Pristav Prize, awarded to him in 2015 by the Czech Council for Children and Youth. He regularly participates as a guest at the Economic Forum in Krynica, Poland.

Personal life
Since the age of 11, Farsky has been an avid member of the Scouting movement. Since 2013 he has been the director of a Scout Centre in Semily, and he has proposed the creation of a Scout Reserve in the former military area of Ralsko. His hobbies include travel, literature, hiking, cycling, and slope skiing.

References

1979 births
Living people
People from Turnov
Masaryk University alumni
Mayors of places in the Czech Republic
Members of the Chamber of Deputies of the Czech Republic (2017–2021)
Members of the Chamber of Deputies of the Czech Republic (2010–2013)
Members of the Chamber of Deputies of the Czech Republic (2013–2017)
Members of the Chamber of Deputies of the Czech Republic (2021–2025)
Mayors and Independents politicians